Strader v. Graham, 51 U.S. (10 How.) 82 (1851), was a US Supreme Court decision that held that the status of three slaves who went from Kentucky to Indiana and Ohio depended on Kentucky law, rather than Ohio law. The original plaintiff was Christopher Graham, whose three slaves had traveled to Cincinnati, Ohio, aboard a steamboat owned by Jacob Strader and James Gorman and piloted by John Armstrong. The slaves later escaped to Canada. The US Supreme Court recognized the authority of the Northwest Ordinance of 1789 over its applicable territories in Strader v. Graham but did not extend the Northwest Ordinance to cover the states that were later admitted to the Union.

See also
American slave court cases
List of United States Supreme Court cases, volume 51

References

External links

 

1851 in United States case law
United States Supreme Court cases
United States slavery case law
United States Supreme Court cases of the Taney Court
African-American history of Ohio
African-American history of Kentucky